Micrelephas is a genus of moths of the family Crambidae.

Species
Micrelephas chalybeus B. Landry, 2003
Micrelephas crassipalpis Dognin, 1905
Micrelephas gaskini B. Landry, 2003
Micrelephas helenae B. Landry, 2003
Micrelephas interruptus (Zeller, 1866)
Micrelephas kadenii (Zeller, 1863)
Micrelephas longicilia Landry & Becker in Landry, Becker & Mally, 2013
Micrelephas mesodonta (Zeller, 1877)
Micrelephas pictella (Schaus, 1922)
Micrelephas pseudokadenii B. Landry, 2003

References

Natural History Museum Lepidoptera genus database

Crambini
Crambidae genera